Maringá is a municipality in southern Brazil founded on 10 May 1947 as a planned urban area. It is the third largest city in the state of Paraná, with 385,753 inhabitants in the city proper, and 764,906 in the metropolitan area (IBGE 2013). Located in northwestern Paraná, and crossed by the Tropic of Capricorn, it is a regional centre for commerce, services, agro-industries, and universities, including the State University of Maringá.

History

Toponymy
Maringá takes its name from a song by Joubert de Carvalho in honour of his great love, Maria do Ingá, later shortened to Maringá. As a result, the city is nicknamed "Song City". At the time the settlement was established, the song was very popular in the media.

Settlement

The region's fertile land encouraged São Paulo colonists to move in and acquire new areas for production of coffee beans, an important product for exportation.
The northern region of Paraná encloses nearly 100 thousand km2. It is watered by the Rivers Paranapanema, Paraná, Ivaí and Piquiri.
The urban project requested by the British Company Improvements North of the Paraná (Melhoramentos Co.) and elaborated by the city planner Jorge Macedo Vieira, defined the outlines of the new city. Maringá received the status of municipality on 14 November 1951.

The company, worried about deforestation proceeding from the occupation foreseen in the urbanistics projects, reserved three great ecological areas within the urban limits: the Forest Horto, the Park of the Ingá and Forest II and the city was planned as a "garden city" from the beginning.

Demography

Ethnicity
The region of Maringá has been greatly influenced by Japanese immigrants, alongside Italian and German immigrants. Portuguese descendants also have a considerable presence in the city. Other prevalent ethnic groups are African and Amerindian descendants, Poles, Spaniards, Ukrainians, Arabs, Jews, Russians, and a very small group of British descendants.

Distribution of the population living in Maringá according to race or skin color:

Source: Census 2012

People born in Maringá
Sônia Braga - Actress
Celso Portiolli :pt:Celso Portiolli - TV host
Fernanda Machado :pt:Fernanda Machado - Actress
Helena Louro - Actress

Religion
Roman Catholicism is the single largest religious denomination in the city; other major denominations include the various branches of Protestantism, and also Islam, Buddhism, Shinto, Spiritism, among others. Roman Catholics are the majority and have remained constant, while Protestants have grown 2.41%, and those who do not profess a religion have dropped to 2.03%.
Roman Catholicism: 73.72%
Protestantism: 21.15%
Islam, Buddhism, Spiritism, Atheism and others: 5.13%.

Source: Observatório das Metrópoles UFRJ.

Geography

Climate
Maringá experiences a tropical climate bordering on a humid subtropical climate. It has well distributed rainfall, where the average temperature of the coldest month is around 17.8 °C (64 °F) and average annual temperatures around 21.95 °C (71.51 °F).
Because of its location, situated in southern Brazil and crossed by the Tropic of Capricorn, the region of Maringá is influenced by several macro-climatic factors caused by migration of air masses from the Atlantic Ocean and from the Tropical zone.
In the winter the infiltration of cold air from the polar front is relatively common, and frosts can occur.

Flora

The city, planned from its inception, offers an enviable flora.

The city preserves within its limits large areas of native forest in the Horto Florestal, Parque dos Pioneiros (Bosque II) and Parque do Inga, this being open to the public. It also includes smaller preserved areas as the Parque do Cinquentenário, private areas and so on.

Throughout the year it is possible to observe its tree-lined streets that produce a good air to breathe, but especially in the passage from winter to spring, many trees explode in flowers.

Pollution
Even with the normal problems of urban centers, Maringá preserves its reputation as a green city, ecologically well cared for. Its origin had planning, urban planning - forest reserves, central construction site, wide avenues, several species of trees that follow a Master Plan

Proportionally, Maringá has one of the largest fleets per capita of vehicles of Paraná State. Because of it, there are some places of the city with pollution levels above the recommended. Two regions in the city are the biggest problems, they are the avenue Duque de Caxias and Colombo. Industries, pesticides, noise pollution and household waste, also contribute very significantly to the pollution of the city. In spite of this, Maringá still preserves a reputation of green city.

Economy

Maringá is highlighted today by the commercial sector and service delivery.  The service sector is
Maringá's largest (76,74%), followed by industrial (22,29%) and farming (0,97%). Within industry, the food-processing, chemical and textile sectors predominate.

Agriculture
The agriculture still is fundamental for Maringá, although its importance has declined in recent years. Farming is diversified, and besides coffee, today are produced corn, wheat, cotton, ramie, beans, peanuts, rice, sugar cane, and especially soybeans.

Industry
Among the various segments in the industrial sector of Maringá, there are metal-mechanics, agribusiness, textile and food companies.
The industrial sector is not as expressive as agriculture, but it's growing. The city has a growing fleet that handles weaving and agribusiness, but mostly clothing. Big industries such as Cocamar, Coca-Cola, Noma, among others, foster job creation in the region, and even other cities. Metalworking industries serving the entire country and also exports to countries in Latin America a very large range of products. Maringá is the fashion hub in the south of Brazil, with the largest wholesale mall in Latin America, the Mercosul. Recently, Maringá also has been highlighted in the software market, with a consolidated APL (Local Productive Arrangements).

Service sector
Maringá has five shopping malls: Avenida Center Mall, Cidade Mall, Mandacaru Boulevard Mall, Maringá Park Mall (formerly Aspen Park Mall) and Catuaí Maringá Mall, this is the second largest shopping mall in the State of Paraná (behind only Londrina Catuaí Mall).
The commercial vocation of Maringá can be proven by dynamism and variety of items offered by companies from the sectors of food products, pharmaceuticals, clothing, appliances, fittings, bookstores, restaurants, snack bars. And for being a polo wholesaler, commodity prices are also competitive. These factors combine to attract consumers from different regions of Paraná, southwest of São Paulo and some cities in Mato Grosso and Mato Grosso do Sul.
The companies act in at least seven segments of the wholesale market: food, dry goods and offal, paper, glass, textiles, wood, auto parts and appliances. Not to mention the many garment industries, which basically sell them at wholesale.
The city houses the Maringa and Region Convention & Visitors Bureau, an organization of character and independent nonprofit whose goal is to develop the regional economy by encouraging tourism events. Established and maintained by public and private initiatives related to tourism and events industry, it is responsible for planned development of the same, including the city effectively in the national and international tourist circuits.

Sílvio Name Júnior Regional Airport has scheduled air connections to major centers in Brazil.

Sports

Maringá currently has two professional football clubs, Grêmio Maringá and Maringá FC, the first play in the 2nd division of the Paranaense Championship and the second play in the 1st division of the Paranaense Championship. Both play their games at the Stadium Willie Davids, with a capacity up to 15,300 fans. The most traditional club is Grêmio Maringá, who has won three State Championships, and has been four times with the vice-championship. Meanwhile, Maringá FC never won titles. They city used to have a third team, currently dormant, Adap Galo Maringá. All the teams play at the city's stadium Estádio Willie Davids.

Universities
Among several private faculties, the ones that usually stand out in terms of number of undergraduates and graduates are:

UEM - Universidade Estadual de Maringá (Paraná State-sponsored Public university)
UEM, the only public university of Maringa (in Portuguese)

CESUMAR - Centro de Estudos Superiores de Maringá called Centro Universitario de Maringá
Cesumar one of the private faculties in Maringá (in Portuguese)

PUC - Pontificia Universidade Catolica do Paraná - Campus Maringá

Media
Maringá is well served by internet, radio, print newspapers, television, telephone and mobile phone companies. Maringá has 15 TV stations and substations and 14 Radio FM stations.

Twin towns – sister cities

Maringá is twinned with:
 Caserta, Italy (2000)
 General San Martín, Argentina (1993)
 Kakogawa, Japan (1972)
 Leiria, Portugal (1982)

Notable people 
Notable people from Maringá include:
 Celso Portiolli, television presenter
 Felipe Drugovich, racing driver
 Gilsinho, footballer
 Leonardo Drugovich, former professional footballer
 Sergio Moro, former judge and politician
 Sônia Braga, actress

See also
Catedral de Maringá

References

External links

Official homepage (in Portuguese)
Everything about Maringá (in Portuguese, English, French, Italian and Spanish)
some pictures can be found here (in Portuguese)
everything about Maringá (in Portuguese)

 
Populated places established in 1947
1947 establishments in Brazil